Madhura Velankar-Satam (Marathi:मधुरा वेलणकर; born 8 October 1981) is an Indian actress. She is a four-time State Award winner who appears in Bollywood and Marathi movies and established herself as one of Marathi cinema's leading actresses.

She is known for critically acclaimed roles such as Gojiri’ in Sarivar Sari. She worked in Bollywood film Jajantaram Mamantaram as Rajkumari Amori (2003).

She worked in Marathi television serials. She performed as a dancer at Rashtrapati Bhavan (Marathi Taarka), Maharshta State Awards (performed since 2002), Zee Awards, V. Shantaram Awards, Hirkani Awards. She did more than 75 stage shows as a dancer and anchor.

Personal life 
She married Abhijeet Satam. Her family includes father-in-law Shivaji Satam (famous for starring in Sony TV’s CID). Her father Pradeep Velankar is a Marathi actor.

Works

Film

Bollywood 
 Jajantaram Mamantaram (Hindi mainstream)
 Johnny Johnny Yes Papa (Hindi mainstream)

Marathi cinema 
 Not Only Mrs. Raut (Vishesh Abhinetri,  Maharashtra State award), ( RACE Award)
 Adhantari (Vishesh Abhinetri,  Maharashtra State award)
 Khabardar
 Matichya Chuli
 Sarivar Sari (Best Actress, Sanskritik Kala Darpan)
 Gojiri
 Akhanda Saubhyagvati 
 Aai No.1 
 Me Amruta boltey 
 Made in China
 Uladhal
 Ek Daav Dhobi Pachad 
 Canvas
 Kshano Kshani
 Guilty
 Rangi be Rangi 
 Haapus
 Paaulwaat
 Jana Gana Mana
 Ashach Eka Betawar

Television
 Mrunmayi (Zee Marathi)
 Chakravyuha (Zee TV)
 Saanj Sawlya (ETV Marathi)
 Aaplach Ghar (ETV Marathi)
 Saata Janmachya Gaathi (ETV Marathi)
 Anamika (ETV Marathi) (Best Actress, Sanskritik Kala Darpan)
 Ladhai Dahavichi (ETV Marathi)
 Aata Bolana (ETV Marathi)
 Star Best Sellers (Star Plus)
 Rishtey (Zee TV)
 Surmai Shaam (ETV Marathi)
 Spandan (ETV Marathi)
 Tumchi Mulgi Kay Karte? (Sony Marathi)
 Aajchi Nayika (Zee Marathi)

Plays 

 Lagnabambaal
 Mr & Mrs
 Ha shekhar khosala kon aahe?

Telefilms

 Aham
 Sur Julta Julta (Etv)
 Daav songaticha

Documentary Films 

 Maharashtra Paryatan Vibhaag

Short films

 Midnight
 Suicide
 Tyre Ki Hawa Puncture Gayi saab (International award winner)
 Aai Shapat, winner of The Perfect 10 at The Mumbai Film Festival

Awards 

 Vishesh Abhinetri for Not Only Mrs.Raut (Maharashtra State award)&( RACE Award)
 Vishesh Abhinetri For Adhantari (Maharashtra State award)
 MICTA award (best actress) for Mr & Mrs
 Maharashtra State Award Best actress (silver medal) for Mr & Mrs 
 Natyaparishad puraskar (best actress) for Ha Shekhar khosala kon aahe?
 Maharashtra State Award Best actress (silver medal) for Lagnabambaal
 Best actress Saskruti Kala Darpan for Lagnabambaal
 Sari var Sari (Best Actress) Sanskrtik Kala Darpan
 Anamika (Etv) (Best Actress) Sanskritik Kala Darpan
 Umed Puraskar
 Kala Gaurav Puraskar
 Saibaai Puraskar

References

External links 
 

Indian film actresses
Indian television actresses
Living people
1986 births
Actresses from Pune
21st-century Indian actresses
Marathi actors
Actresses in Marathi cinema
Actresses in Hindi cinema